The 2019 Central Arkansas Bears football team represents the University of Central Arkansas in the 2019 NCAA Division I FCS football season as a member of the Southland Conference. The Bears are led by second-year head coach Nathan Brown and play their home games at Estes Stadium. UCA finished the regular season 9-3 overall, 7-2 in Southland Conference play, earning a share of the 2019 Southland Conference championship, and a first round bye in the FCS playoffs with a #8 seeding.

Previous season
The Bears finished the 2018 season 6–5, 5–4 in Southland play to finish in a four-way tie for fourth place.

Preseason

Preseason poll
The Southland Conference released their preseason poll on July 18, 2019. The Bears were picked to finish in second place.

Preseason All–Southland Teams
The Bears placed seven players on the preseason all–Southland teams.

Offense

1st team

Carlos Blackman – RB

Hunter Watts – OL

2nd team

Toby Sanderson – OL

Defense

1st team

Chris Terrell – DL

Juan Jackson – DB

2nd team

Jackie Harvell – DB

Robert Rochell – DB

Schedule

Source:

Game summaries

at Western Kentucky

at Austin Peay

Abilene Christian

at Hawaii

at Nicholls

McNeese State

at Northwestern State

Sam Houston State

at Lamar

Southeastern Louisiana

Stephen F. Austin

at Incarnate Word

FCS Playoffs
The Bears enter the postseason tournament as the number eight seed, with a first-round bye. They will play Illinois State at Estes Stadium in Conway on December 7.

Illinois State–Second Round

Ranking movements

References

Central Arkansas
Central Arkansas Bears football seasons
Southland Conference football champion seasons
Central Arkansas
Central Arkansas Bears football